A mobile home is a prefabricated structure, often used as homes. 

Mobile home can also refer to:

 Mobile Home (album), a 1999 album by Longpigs
 Mobile Home (film), a 2012 Belgian film
 Mobile Homes (film), a 2017 Canadian film

See also
 Motorhome, a vehicle with living accommodation